Saputara is a hill station located in Sahyadris or Western Ghats. Saputara town is part of Dang district in Gujarat, India. It is a tourist destination.

Famous Places 
There are so many famous place that attract more tourist they are some Hathgadh Fort, Vansda National Park, Sunrise Point, Sunset Point, Saputara Lake, Gira falls, Echo Point, Step Garden, Table Point, Saputara Tribal Museum, Lake Garden, Saptashringi Devi Mandir, Purna Sanctuary and many more.

Sunrise and Sunset Point 
The sunrise point is the best place to feel the view of sunrise that look so beautiful and you feel the beauty of nature. The sunset point is also the best and famous place for tourist to view the sunset and feel the beauty of nature and enjoy the movements.

Best time to Visit 
The best time to visit Saputara is Winter. The Winter season begins in October and goes on till February. Though the winter temperature in Saputara can drop as low as 8 °C, overall, the weather remains quite enjoyable. The maximum temperature here during winters is 28 °C so it nice for tourist.

Demographics 
As per 2011 census of India, the Saputara notified area has population of 2,968 of which 1,031 are males while 1,937 are females. The literacy rate of Saputara is 87.4%. Thus Saputara has higher literacy rate compared to 75.2% of The Dangs district. The male literacy rate is 89.73% and the female literacy rate is 86.29% in Saputara.

Transportation 
Saputara lies on National Highway 953 which connects to Songadh in Gujarat and Pimpalgaon Baswant in Maharashtra.

Gallery

See also
 Kim River

References
5.Saputara Hill Station https://desiretravelling.com/saputara-hill-station/

Hill stations in Gujarat
Cities and towns in Dang district, India
Hills of Gujarat